Demetrius I ( 1093 – 1156), from the Bagrationi dynasty, was King of Georgia from 1125 to 1156. He is also known as a poet. He was King of United Georgian kingdom two times, first in 1125 to 1154 and second in 1155 before his death in 1156.

Life
Demetrius was the eldest son of King David the Builder by his first wife Rusudan. He was brought up in Kutaisi. As a commander, he took part in his father's battles against Seljuks, particularly at Didgori (1121) and Shirvan (1123). In 1117, he was sent by David at the head of a Georgian army into Shirvan, where Demetrius reduced the fortress of Kaladzor (later Alberd, now Ağdaş) and put to flight the men of Sökmen II, "commander of all the forces of Persia" — as a Georgian chronicler suggests. This Sökmen was probably a Shah-Armen prince, and subsequently, ruler in his own right, Sökmen II, whom the Shirvanshah Afridun I must have applied for help. Demetrius succeeded on his father's death on January 24, 1125.

As soon as, he ascended to the throne, the neighbouring Muslim rulers began attacking Georgia from all sides. The Seljuqid sultans fought to restore the rule of the Shirvanshahs. Shirvan's large Muslim population rose against Georgia. This probably happened in 1129 or 1130, when Demetrius restored the Shirvanshahs to power in Shirvan, installing on the throne Manuchihr II, the husband of his daughter Rusudan. The Shirvanshahs had to provide the Georgian king with troops whenever the latter demanded it. In 1130, Georgia was attacked by the Sultan of Ahlat, Shah-Armen Sökmen II ( 1128–1183). This war was started by the passage of Ani into the hands of the Georgians; Demetrius I had to compromise and give up Ani to the Shaddadid emir Fadl ibn Mahmud on terms of vassalage and inviolability of the Christian churches. In 1139, Demetrius raided the city of Ganja in Arran. He brought the iron gate of the defeated city to Georgia and donated it to Gelati Monastery at Kutaisi. Despite this brilliant victory, Demetrius could hold Ganja only for a few years. In reply to this, the sultan of the Eldiguzids attacked Ganja several times, and in 1143 the town again fell to the sultan. According to Mkhitar Gosh, Demetrius ultimately gained possession of Ganja, but, when he gave his daughter in marriage to the sultan, he presented the latter with the town as dowry, and the sultan appointed his own emir to rule it. Thus, Ganja once again fell into the hands of the Eldiguzids.

In 1130, Demetrius revealed a plot of nobles, probably involving the king's half-brother Vakhtang. The King arrested the conspirators and executed one of their leaders, Ioanne Abuletisdze, in 1138 (or 1145).

Fadl's successor, Fakr al-Din Shaddad, a Shaddadid emir of Ani asked for Saltuk's daughter's hand, however Saltuk refused him. This caused a deep hatred in Shaddad towards Saltuk. In 1154 he planned a plot and formed a secret alliance with the Demetrius I. While a Georgian army waited in ambush, he offered tribute to Saltukids, ruler of Erzerum and asked the latter to accept him as a vassal. In 1153–1154, Emir Saltuk II marched on Ani, but Shaddad informed his suzerain, the King of Georgia, of this. Demetrius marched to Ani, defeated and captured the emir. At the request of neighbouring Muslim rulers and released him for a ransom of 100,000 dinars, paid by Saltuk's sons in law and Saltuk swore not to fight against the Georgians he returned home.

In 1154, David V, Demetrius's elder son forced his father to abdicate and become a monk in the Davit Gareja monastery, where he received the monastic name Damian (Damianus). However, David died six months later and King Demetrius was restored to the throne. David was survived by his son Demna who was regarded by the aristocratic opposition as a lawful pretender.

Demetre did not remain as ruler however. He crowned his younger son, Giorgi, as co-ruler, and retired to Davit Gareja for good, where he wrote hymns until his death.

Although Demetrius was not as successful as his father David the Builder, Georgia remained a strong feudal power with a well-organized military and political system and a developed cultural and economical life.

He died in 1156 and was buried at Gelati Monastery.

He is regarded as a saint in the Orthodox Church and his feast day is celebrated on May 23 on the Eastern Orthodox liturgical calendar.

Marriage and children
The name of Demetrius's wife is unknown, but he had several children:

David V, 7th king of Georgia
Rusudan, married firstly with sultan Masud Temirek and secondly with Sultan Ahmad Sanjar
Giorgi III, 8th king of Georgia, who succeeded him
Bagrationi, who married prince of Kiev
An unnamed daughter who married Emir Abu al-Muzaffar of Derbent
Kata, later known as Eudoxia, who married Alexios Komnenos (co-emperor)

Poems
King Demetrius I was an author of several poems, mainly on religious themes. Shen Khar Venakhi, a hymn to the Virgin Mary, is the most famous of them.

See also
Family of David IV of Georgia

References

External links

Listen to the hymn “Thou Art the Vineyard”
St Damiane (Demetrius) the King and Hymnographer Orthodox synaxarion

1090s births
1156 deaths
12th-century Christian saints
Eastern Orthodox royal saints
Hymnographers
Kings of Georgia
Bagrationi dynasty of the Kingdom of Georgia